William Overstreet may refer to:
 William Overstreet Jr., American fighter pilot
 William Benton Overstreet, American songwriter, bandleader and pianist
 Bill Overstreet, mayor of Juneau, Alaska 
 Will Overstreet, American football linebacker